Cupedia is a genus of moths in the family Gracillariidae.

Species
Cupedia cupediella (Herrich-Schäffer, 1855)

External links
Global Taxonomic Database of Gracillariidae (Lepidoptera)

Gracillariinae
Gracillarioidea genera